Mariano Montealegre Bustamante (1783, Guatemala City – 1843) was the first diplomat and first vice head of state of Costa Rica, and the half brother of Mariano Montealegre y Romero, the founder of the Nicaraguan branch of the Montealegre family.  

He also served in the Tabaco Factories of Nicaragua and San Salvador.

References 

1783 births
1843 deaths
People from Guatemala City
Costa Rican people of Spanish descent
Vice presidents of Costa Rica
Costa Rican diplomats